The Incremental Capital-Output Ratio (ICOR) is the ratio of investment to growth which is equal to the reciprocal of the marginal product of capital. The higher the ICOR, the lower the productivity of capital or the marginal efficiency of capital. The ICOR can be thought of as a measure of the inefficiency with which capital is used. In most countries the ICOR is in the neighborhood of 3. It is a topic discussed in economic growth. It can be expressed in the following formula, where K is capital output ratio, Y is output (GDP), and I is net investment.

According to this formula the incremental capital output ratio can be computed by dividing the investment share in GDP by the rate of growth of GDP. As an example, if the level of investment (as a share of GDP) in a developing country had been (approximately) 20% over a particular period, and if the growth rate of GDP had been (approximately) 5% per year during the same period, then the ICOR would be 20/5 = 4.

ICOR, world, and determining variables

Further reading 
 van Rijckeghem, Willy "The Secret of the Variable ICOR" The Economic Journal, December 1968, Vol LXXVOO, pp.984-85.
 Reinhart, Carmen M. "Comment" on Giancarlo Corsetti, Paolo Pesenti, and Nouriel Roubini: "Fundamental Determinants of the Asian Crisis: The Role of Financial Fragility and External Imbalances", in Takatoshi Ito and Anne Krueger, eds. Regional and Global Capital Flows: Macroeconomic Causes and Consequences (Chicago: University of Chicago Press for the NBER, 2001), 42–45. . .

Capital (economics)
Financial ratios
Investment indicators